Muhammad ibn Abd Allah al-Ashja'i was the eleventh governor of al-Andalus under the Umayyad Caliphate in AD 730 (AH 111–112). He was one of a series of Arabs from Ifriqiya who served as governors in al-Andalus from 721 to 731.

After ten months in office, Muhammad's predecessor, al-Haytham, was confronted by an attempted coup d'état in early 730. He arrested the conspirators, but their relatives in turn complained about his heavy-handedness to his superior, the governor of Ifriqiya. According to the Chronicle of 754, the earliest source, al-Haytham was arrested and brought to Ifriqiya, but because his intended replacement, al-Qhafiqi, could not be found, Muhammad was appointed to replace him instead. His formal appointment took place, according to the Chronicle, one month after al-Haytham had been removed.

According to the Prophetic Chronicle, written in 883, he only governed for one month. Al-Maqqari, a very late source, puts his term of office in March–May 731, a year later than the earlier chronicles indicate, but right before the generally accepted date for when al-Ghafiqi finally took up office.

Notes

Sources

Umayyad governors of Al-Andalus
8th-century people from the Umayyad Caliphate
8th-century Arabs